Theatre-Five (aka Theater-Five or Theatre 5) was a radio drama series, presented by ABC between 1964 and 1965. The series used an anthology format, presenting a number of short (20-minute) radio plays across a number of genres, a number of which reflected topical issues contemporary with its airing.

Writers for the show varied, as did actors, although a principal cast included George O. Petrie, Brett Morrison, Jackson Beck, Robert Dryden, Elliott Reid, Court Benson, Cliff Carpenter, and Bryna Raeburn. The show's 1965 run featured several well-known actors, including an early role for James Earl Jones (Incident on US 1), a pre-M*A*S*H Alan Alda (A Bad Day's Work), and Ed Begley (The Pigeon) three years after his Academy Award win. Another Theatre-Five actor was Romeo Muller, who also wrote stories for the series but who became best known for his work with Rankin/Bass Productions such as Rudolph the Red-Nosed Reindeer (TV special).

The ABC Radio Network Advance Program Schedule for January 1965 indicates Theatre 5 was fed to subscribing affiliates from 2:30 to 2:54 PM EST and again from 10:29 to 10:54 PM EST Monday through Friday.

Sources 
Theatre Five (Theatre 5) Radio Program
ABC Radio Network Advance Program Schedule, January, 1965

References

External links
OTR Plot Spot: Theatre Five - plot summaries and reviews.
Theater Five single episodes

1960s American radio programs
1964 radio programme debuts
1965 radio programme endings
ABC radio programs
American radio dramas
Anthology radio series